Borj Rahal is a town in the Tyre District in South Lebanon.

Name

According to E. H. Palmer in 1881, the name Burj Rahhal  means "the traveller’s tower".

History
In the 1860s, Ernest Renan  found here seven singular constructions  in a row, three being open, the rest closed. He was also informed that to the north-east of these, there were seven more hidden under grounds. The locals  call them the Tombs of the Tyrian Kings, Kubur el Moluk.

In 1875, Victor Guérin found here a village with 400 Metawileh inhabitants. "Here are seen good cut stones lying here and there, taken from an ancient fort."

He further noted: "Ten minutes to the west of the village I observed three good subterranean magazines contiguous and parallel. Partly cut in the rock and partly constructed of cut stones, they measure ten metres in length by a breadth not greater than a metre and a half. They are covered within by a stony cement, in which are inserted fragments of pottery, and arc surmounted by great inclined slabs forming a triangular roof. These are covered over by a layer of earth, so as to form a platform. Several other similar caves are adjoining them, but they are at the present moment closed. Formerly they probably served as oil and wine- cellars, or stores for corn. The place is called Kh. Mahatma."

In 1881, the PEF's Survey of Western Palestine (SWP) described it as: "A large village built of stone, containing 150 Metawileh, on a ridge, surrounded by figs, olives, and arable land. There is a good spring and well near."  They further noted:  "A few more minutes to the west,  Guérin found a ruin called Kh. Kerry el Meserta, where he observed the uprights of grooved oil-presses, broken sarcophagi, mill stones, numerous little cubes of mosaic scattered about, and a great cistern extending under a platform. At twenty minutes' march west-south-west of El Meserta, he observed a hillock with the remains of a ruined village called Kh. Halua. Not far from this place, to the east-north-east, he found a platform surrounded by a wall of large stones, having a great cistern hollowed in the middle. It is called Bir el Mellaha."

References

Bibliography

External links
Borj Rahhal - Ain Abou Abdallah - Ain Zarka, Localiban 
Survey of Western Palestine, Map 1:  IAA, Wikimedia commons 

Populated places in Tyre District
Shia Muslim communities in Lebanon